Tiago Jorge de Oliveira Ferreira (born 7 December 1988) is a Portuguese mountain biker from Viseu, who specialises in the cross-country discipline.

In June 2016, he won the cross-country marathon silver medal at the European Championships in Sigulda, Latvia. Three weeks later, he won the gold medal at the 2016 UCI Mountain Bike Marathon World Championships in Laissac, France, becoming the second Portuguese cyclist to win a world championship title, after Rui Costa.

References

Portuguese male cyclists
Living people
1988 births
Olympic cyclists of Portugal
Cyclists at the 2016 Summer Olympics
UCI Mountain Bike World Champions (men)
People from Viseu
Sportspeople from Viseu District